Burkina Faso competed at the 2020 Summer Paralympics in Tokyo, Japan, from 24 August to 5 September 2021. This was their fourth consecutive appearance at the Summer Paralympics since 2008 and their seventh overall.

Competitors
The following is the list of number of competitors participating in the Games:

Athletics 

Men's track

Men's field

Women's field

See also 
 Burkina Faso at the Paralympics
 Burkina Faso at the 2020 Summer Olympics

External links 
 Paralympics website 

Nations at the 2020 Summer Paralympics
2020
Summer Paralympics